Aletia infrargyrea is a moth of the family Noctuidae first described by Max Saalmüller in 1891. It is known from Madagascar.

This species has a wingspan of 26–28 mm.

References

Moths described in 1891
Hadeninae
Moths of Madagascar
Moths of Africa